Arcilla is a surname. Notable people with this surname include:
Francisco Arcilla (born 1984), Spanish racewalker
Jay Arcilla (born 1996), Filipino actor
John Arcilla (born 1966), Filipino actor
Johnny Arcilla (born 1980), Filipino tennis player

See also
Arlene B. Arcillas (born 1969), Filipino mayor
Arcillas de Morella Formation, a geological formation in Spain
Arcila (surname)
Archila

Spanish-language surnames